Twilight Imperium is a strategy board game produced by Fantasy Flight Games in the genre of science fiction and space opera. It was designed by Christian T. Petersen and was first released in 1997. The game is in its fourth edition (2017), which has large changes over previous editions. It is known for the length of its gameplay (often greater than six hours), and its in-depth strategy (including military, political, technological and trade).

Game background
The game's premise is a large-scale space opera. It is set in the unstable power vacuum left after the centuries-long decline and collapse of the previously dominant Lazax race. The old galactic central capital, Mecatol Rex, located in the center of the map is maintained by custodians who maintain the imperial libraries and oversee the meetings of the galactic council. Players assume the roles of rising empires on the fringes of the galaxy, vying for military and political control, until one finally becomes sufficiently dominant to take over as a new galactic emperor.

Development history

First Edition
The first edition of Twilight Imperium was conceived by Christian T. Petersen while working as an importer of European comics. Drawing from a background of working at a Danish game importer, Petersen designed, published, and assembled the first edition of the game single-handedly. The final version of the first edition debuted at the Origins Game Fair in 1997. Fantasy Flight set up demos of the game in a high-traffic corridor to garner more attention, and ended up selling out of all of their available copies in under two days.

Second Edition
The second edition of Twilight Imperium was published in 2000. It was the first edition of the game to feature art by Scott Schomburg and Brian Schomburg. It also introduced plastic spaceship pieces, replacing cardboard tokens that were used in the first edition.

Third Edition
The third edition of Twilight Imperium, published in 2004, was designed at roughly the same time that Petersen was also working on A Game of Thrones, and his desire was to emphasize similar narrative development in this new edition's gameplay. He also looked to the mechanics of Eurogames like Puerto Rico for inspiration of how to represent complex mechanisms simply. The game box proved to be so large that wholesale distributors had to purchase custom-sized shipping cartons in order to make them fit.

Fourth Edition
Development of Twilight Imperium Fourth Edition began in 2015. The original plan for the game was to seek funding on the crowdsourcing website Kickstarter, releasing a product with an MSRP of approximately US$250. Ideas pitched for this version included featuring only the six original races but each with unique ship designs, as well as presenting Mecatol Rex as centrepiece figure instead of a tile. However, this plan was scrapped in the summer of 2016 as the features were proving too costly to create within their budget. The revised version included all previous species introduced into Twilight Imperium, and was released at Gen Con in August 2017. Fourth edition was initially intended as a stand-alone game without any variant rules and expansions, but the expansion Prophecy of Kings was introduced in November 2020.

Components

The game consists of cardboard map tiles, cards, plastic units, cardboard counters, and player sheets. The map is built from hexagonal tiles, each showing up to three planets, empty space, or a red-bordered system containing an obstacle (with additional types added in the expansions). The centre tile is always Mecatol Rex, with the remainder of the galaxy built out in concentric rings.

Plastic playing pieces represent various starship classes and ground forces. Players are limited to the number of playing pieces provided with the game, except for fighters and ground forces. Counters are included for record-keeping, including command tokens, control markers, trade goods, and extra fighter and ground force counters. Cards are used to track planet ownership, trade agreements, technologies, public objectives, secret objectives, special actions, and policy voting agendas.

Gameplay

Three to six (eight, with 'Prophecy of Kings') players can play, with games typically taking more than six hours to complete (approx. 1.5 hours per player), although players new to the game can take longer. The game works on a 'victory points' system such that players earn points by completing a combination of public and secret objectives.

Setup
Each player randomly selects a race to control. Either a pre-designed map can be used, or players can generate a map via a pre-game mechanic whereby each takes turns in placing map tiles to construct a galaxy map with Mecatol Rex at the centre and home systems around the periphery.

Factions 

Players can choose from several alien factions (up to 25 in the 4th edition) to play as. Anywhere from three to six (or eight, with the 'Prophecy of Kings' expansion) of these factions will appear in a game, depending on the number of players. Each faction has unique abilities, home planets, starter units and technologies. Additionally, each faction has distinct characters and themes, and they each specialize in particular areas of the game, such as trade, combat, technology, or politics.

Faction list below:

Rounds
Play consists of up to 10 rounds (though usually less, depending on how quickly players gain victory points) -- each of which contain several turns. In each round, players choose a strategy card, which provides large bonuses to a particular gameplay mechanic and determines the order in which the players take turns during the round.

Players take turns to perform actions (building units, moving units, using strategy cards, using special action cards). Players are limited in the number of actions they can take during a round by their supply of command tokens, which are divided between strategy (used to access the secondary action of other players' strategy cards), fleet supply (limiting the number of ships that can occupy a system), and command pools (used for tactical actions). Players continue taking actions in turn order until each player has passed.

Units and combat
Units are purchased throughout the game using the resources from occupied planets. Combat is fought in rounds with each unit rolling one or more 10-sided dice to attempt to score "hits" on the enemy player, who is allowed a counter-attack with all their units before choosing which units are destroyed.

Politics
Politics and discussion play an important role in Twilight Imperium. Agendas are voted on at multiple points throughout the game, with each player's voting power being proportional to the quality and quantity of planets they control. Laws that are successfully passed can greatly modify certain game mechanics and thus change the flow of the game.

Scoring
At the end of each round, players have the opportunity to score victory points for a public goal that has been revealed and/or for a secret objective assigned to each player at the start of the game. The first player to achieve 10 victory points is declared the new Emperor and wins the game. After the 6th round, the game also has a mechanism where the game has a chance of ending on any subsequent round and the highest scoring player at that point declared the winner.

Online implementation 

A community-made implementation of the game was created in Tabletop Simulator. It stems from a fan-version of the third edition game called "Shattered Ascension" that was built in Tabletop Simulator in 2011 using the same components but a variant ruleset and gained a significant online community. After the publication of game's fourth edition in 2017, a similar Tabletop Simulator implementation was created in 2018 and is now used for online tournaments.

Expansions, variants and optional rules

Twilight Imperium 3rd Edition: Shattered Empire 
Fantasy Flight Games released an expansion called Shattered Empire in December 2006. It includes two new sets of playing pieces and additional system tiles, expanding maximum player number to eight. It also introduced several rules-fixes to address common criticisms of the base game.

Twilight Imperium 3rd Edition: Shards of the Throne
Fantasy Flight Games released a second expansion called Shards of the Throne in May 2011, with additions including new factions, technologies, scenarios and units.

Variant rulesets 
The base game and its expansions come with several optional rules and the counters necessary to play them out. The simplest variant is the long game, where the winner must score 14 victory points, rather than 10. However, most variants are intended to allow players to customise the game-play in favour of their preferred mechanics. For example, there are alternative variants of all the strategy cards, which can drastically alter how players organise their turns. Some rule variants introduce new units, whilst others can introduce completely new mechanics, such as race-specific leaders and diplomats, or random encounters for the first player to land on each neutral planet.

Twilight Imperium 4th Edition: Prophecy of Kings 
Fantasy Flight Games released an expansion for 4th Edition Twilight Imperium in November 2020. The expansion contains seven new factions, some of which are based in the lore of Twilight Imperium's previous editions. It also brings in many of the systems and units that were first contained in 3rd edition. A new layer of technologies has been introduced giving more flexibility on how players choose their technology paths. The expansion also includes the Omega updates that were published in April 2020. It does not include any variant rules and is intended to be fully incorporated into the base game.

Twilight Imperium 4th Edition: Twilight Codex 
The Codex is the official web based publication, published by Fantasy Flight Games that highlights rule updates and showcases new content for Twilight Imperium Fourth Edition and eventually the Prophecy of Kings expansion. The predominant figure behind the codex is Dane Beltrami, the head developer of Twilight Imperium Fourth Edition.

Differences between editions

Third edition vs previous versions
The third edition significantly changed many of the game mechanics. While some of the core elements remained the same, the game as a whole was completely revamped. Here are some of the more significant differences:

 In 2E, only the Hacan, Letnev, N'orr, Jol-Nar, Sol, and Xxcha were playable races. The Mentak and Yssaril were introduced in the Hope's End expansion as new playable races. The L1Z1X were present as non-player hostile invaders, introduced to gameplay via some of the events. The Naalu were completely new to the 3rd Edition (although it first appeared in the first edition expansion: The Outer Rim). While the races present in both games kept the same basic flavor and feel, the racial abilities changed between editions.
 In 2E, the game rounds were broken into phases: the political, production, movement, invasion, and technology steps. Each player had equal access to these phases every round. In 3E, these phases were largely spread out among the Strategy Cards, coupled with the new threaded activation sequence.
 In 2E, players collected credits as tangible money that could be spent from round to round. 3E's spending is mostly done by exhausting planets, though the Trade Good concept does allow some limited form of savable liquid assets.
 In 2E, the only spaceships that could be built were Cruisers, Carriers, Dreadnoughts, and Fighters. 3E introduced Destroyers (cheaper and weaker than Cruisers, but more mobile than Fighters), and War Suns (expensive and powerful super ships).
 While most of the technologies were ported from 2E to 3E, many of the effects changed significantly (largely to fit with the 3E sequence better).
 Politics in 2E was done at the beginning of each game round by drawing a card from a Political Card deck, and voting on the agenda. Some of these cards were events which automatically affected the game in some way (such as introducing hostile L1Z1X forces). In 3E, the concept of "events" was removed completely.
 In 2E, players achieved victory by progressing along a fixed set of objectives, largely centered around the number of resources, influence, and planets controlled, as well as technologies. In 3E, players instead try to achieve Victory Points by completing objectives revealed during the game; these objectives could change from game to game.
 The tiles, cards, and playing pieces in the 3E are noticeably larger in size than their 2E counterparts.

Fourth edition vs previous versions 
 Players now have 17 factions available to choose from, including factions that were only available in the expansions for earlier editions such as the Ghosts of Creuss, The Mentak Coalition, the Naalu Collective, and the Yssaril Tribes. The number of factions has been increased to 24 with the Prophecy of Kings expansion.
 The phases of play in each round are now Strategy, Action, Status, and the Agenda Phase. The Agenda Phase is added only after a player has taken Mecatol Rex.
 In the Strategy Phase, players choose a Strategy Card to use in the upcoming Action Phase. The Strategy Cards now control many of the fundamental mechanics that were tied to a phase in the 3rd Edition. As a result, players may be in competition for a particular strategy card, and a taking a particular Strategy Card may be necessary for a player to achieve certain objectives. The Strategy Cards confer abilities such as the purchase of additional command counters, changing who is the Speaker and thus will get first pick of the strategy cards in the next round, refilling commodities for trade, building Planetary Defense Systems (PDS') or Space Docks, researching technology, drawing additional Action Cards or Secret Objectives, or scoring an objective early (in the Action Phase, while all other players must wait for the Status Phase).
 In the Action Phase, players take turns expanding their empire by moving ships, building units, engaging in trade and combat, researching technology, making deals, using their Strategic and Action Cards, and attempting to complete the requirements for public and secret objectives. The player's initiative order (the turn order) is determined by a player's lowest number Strategy Card, e.g. a player with the Leadership card (no.1) will go first and a player with the Imperial Card (no.8) will go last. The Action Phase continues until every player has chosen to pass, and once a player has passed they cannot make any more tactical actions. Each Strategy Card has a Primary and a Secondary ability - the bearer of a Strategy Card uses only the Primary and the other players may only use the Secondary. So that no player ever misses out on the powerful abilities of the Strategy Cards, the bearer of a Strategy Card may not pass and end their Action Phase until they have used their Strategy Card, and all other players always have the option to use the secondary ability of a Strategy Card once activated, even if they passed on a previous turn. 
 The Status Phase is a book-keeping and maintenance phase. Players score public and secret objectives in the same initiative order from the Action Phase (not clockwise from the Speaker), reveal the next public objective, draw action cards, remove and regain command tokens (and may redistribute command tokens among their tactical, strategic, and fleet pools), ready all exhausted cards (including the strategy and technology and planetary cards), repair any damaged units, and return the strategy cards to a common play area.
 The Agenda Phase has replaced the Politics Phase. Once a player has taken Mecatol Rex, it is appended as the fourth phase after the Status Phase to each round. In the Agenda Phase, players convene the galactic council on Mecatol Rex and vote on two Agendas. Agendas are either Laws (permanent changes to the current game's mechanics, such as allowing all players to build War Suns without needing to research the qualifying technologies) and Directives (a one-time effect such as each player drawing a secret objective, or giving a victory point to the player in last place). Each player casts votes by exhausting their planets for its influence score (where each point of influence is one vote), and may spend as many as they have for the agendas, or abstain from voting. Players may not spend trade goods as influence for casting votes in this phase, but the voting (the active) player is free to offer deals - Promissory Notes, commodities or trade goods - to influence or purchase another player's vote. Players are also allowed to make deals and transactions during the Agenda Phase whether they share borders or not, allowing for the exchange of promissory notes, and commodities and trade goods. Once both agendas have been voted on, the players refresh all their exhausted planets so they have the resources and influence and technology specialties available for the Action Phase in the next round.
 The technology tree has been simplified. Rather than a confusing flow chart of pre-requisites, technological advancement is through four linear branches, and players can upgrade most of the available units by satisfying pre-requisites in the four branches.
 Trade has been simplified. Players now exchange faction commodities which become trade goods when another player acquires them. Instead of requiring trade agreements, the active player is now allowed to trade their commodities with neighbors (anyone they share a border with) during their turn.

List of games

Main game (first edition)
 Twilight Imperium
 Twilight Imperium: Borderlands
 Twilight Imperium: Twilight Armada
 Twilight Imperium: Distant Suns
 Twilight Imperium: The Outer Rim

Main game (second edition)
 Twilight Imperium 2nd Edition
 Twilight Imperium: Hope's EndMain game (third edition)
 Twilight Imperium 3rd Edition Twilight Imperium 3rd Edition – Shattered Empire Twilight Imperium 3rd Edition – Shards of the ThroneMain game (fourth edition)
 Twilight Imperium 4th Edition Twilight Imperium 4th Edition – Prophecy of Kings

Spin-off games
 Mag·Blast
 Mag·Blast (Second Edition)
 Twilight Imperium: Armada
 Twilight Imperium: Armada: Stellar Matter
 Twilight Imperium: Armada: Incursion
 Rex: Final days of an Empire
 Twilight Inscription: An epic roll-and-write experience

Role-playing game
 Twilight Imperium: The Role-Playing Game (1999)

References

External links
 
 
 
 

Board games introduced in 1997
Board games with a modular board
Christian T. Petersen games
Fantasy Flight Games games
Space opera board games
4X games
Space conquest board games